Tarantel (German: Tarantula) was a German monthly satirical magazine in Berlin, West Germany, which was in circulation between 1950 and 1962. Being a propaganda publication it was started to address the readers in East Germany.

History and profile
Tarantel was launched in West Berlin in 1950. Its founder was the German journalist Heinz Wenzel, known as Heinrich Bär, who also edited the magazine. The magazine was first published by Freiheitsverlag Leipzig in a miniature format on a monthly basis. Later Heinrich Bär Verlag became the publisher of the magazine. The company employed Tarantel as part of its propaganda war against East Germany which was ridiculed by the magazine. It also mocked the establishment of the Soviet Union, the Communist Party of East Germany and East German government officials.

Christian F. Ostermann argues that the Kampfgruppe gegen Unmenschlichkeit (KgU) (German: Combat Group against Inhumanity) was behind the magazine. As of 1952 the magazine was among six German organizations which were financed by the US as tools of psychological manipulation in East Germany. Tarantel was funded by the Central Intelligence Agency of the US. The magazine was illegally circulated in East Germany, and possession of it was strictly banned by the East German government. In the late 1950s it sold 250,000-300,000 copies in West Berlin. The magazine folded in 1962.

References

External links

1950 establishments in West Germany
1962 disestablishments in West Germany
Banned magazines
Defunct magazines published in Germany
German humour
German-language magazines
German political satire
Magazines established in 1950
Magazines disestablished in 1962
Magazines published in Berlin
Monthly magazines published in Germany
Satirical magazines published in Germany
Cold War propaganda
Anti-communism in Germany
Propaganda newspapers and magazines
Central Intelligence Agency front organizations